The United States Radiation Exposure Compensation Act (RECA) is a federal statute providing for the monetary compensation of people, including atomic veterans, who contracted cancer and a number of other specified diseases as a direct result of their exposure to atmospheric nuclear testing undertaken by the United States during the Cold War, or their exposure to radon gas and other radioactive isotopes while undertaking uranium mining, milling or the transportation of ore.

The Act provides the following remunerations:
$50,000 to individuals residing or working "downwind" of the Nevada Test Site
$75,000 for workers participating in atmospheric nuclear weapons tests
$100,000 for uranium miners, millers, and ore transporters

In all cases there are additional requirements which must be satisfied (proof of exposure, establishment of duration of employment, establishment of certain medical conditions, etc.).

Origins 
Attempts to enact the legislation can be traced back to the late 1970s. In its fifth draft, a Bill entitled Radiation Exposure Compensation Act of 1979 was sponsored by Senator Ted Kennedy of Massachusetts. The Bill intended to make compensation available to persons exposed to fallout from nuclear weapons testing and for living uranium miners (or their survivors) who had worked in Utah, Colorado, New Mexico and Arizona between 1 January 1947 and 31 December 1961.

The Bill proposed to pay compensation to persons who lived within prescribed areas for at least a year, to persons who "died from, has or has had, leukaemia, thyroid cancer, bone cancer or any other cancer identified by an advisory board on the health effects of radiation and uranium exposure".

Fallout areas listed by the bill included counties in Utah and Nevada.

Utah counties included Millard, Sevier, Beaver, Iron, Washington, Kane, Garfiend, Piute, Wayne, San Juan, Grand, Carbon, Emery, Duchesne, Uintah, San Pete and Juab. Nevada's "affected areas" were listed as the counties of White Pine, Nye, Lander, Lincoln and Eureka. The Bill as drafted, would have also compensated ranchers whose sheep died following nuclear weapons tests "Harry" (13 May 1959) and "Nancy" (24 May 1953).

Twelve years transpired before a similar bill was finally enacted, which added uranium miners who worked in Wyoming to the list, and extended the eligible date rate for employed miners to between 1947 and 1971. In the successful bill it was written that Congress "apologizes on behalf of the nation" to individuals who were "involuntarily subjected to increased risk of injury and disease to serve the national security interests of the United States."

It was initially expected that hundreds of compensation claims would be paid under the Act, a figure which later proved to be a gross underestimate.

Implementation 
The Radiation Exposure Compensation Act was passed by Congress on October 5, 1990, and signed into law by President George H. W. Bush on October 15.

In some cases, it proved to be extremely difficult for people to receive their compensation, including cases filed by widows of uranium miners. Because many uranium miners were Native Americans, they did not have standard marriage licenses required to establish a legal connection to the deceased. In 1999, revisions were published in the Federal Register to assist in making award claims. Many mine workers and their families found the paperwork difficult and qualifications narrow and were declined compensation.

In 2000, additional amendments were passed which added two new claimant categories (uranium mill and ore workers, both eligible to receive as much money as uranium miners), added additional geographic regions to the "downwinder" provisions, changed some of the recognized illnesses, and lowered the threshold radiation exposure for uranium miners.

In 2002, additional amendments were passed as part of another bill, primarily fixing a number of draftsmanship errors in the previous amendments (which had accidentally removed certain geographic areas from the original act) and clarified a number of points.

Eligibility 
In order to be eligible for compensation, an affected uranium industry worker must have developed lung cancer, fibrosis of the lung, pulmonary fibrosis, cor pulmonale related to fibrosis of the lung, silicosis or pneumoconiosis following their employment. In the case of uranium mill workers and ore transporters, renal cancer and chronic renal disease are also compensable conditions.

Status of claims 
As of 15 July 2012, 25,804 claims under the act had been approved (with 9,869 denied), expending a total of $1,707,998,044.

As of 19 November 2013, 43,068 claims were filed, 11,619 claims were denied, 748 claims were pending and 30,701 were awarded. These numbers did not include the Marshall Islands.

As of 2 March 2015, over $2 billion in total compensation had been paid to 32,000 successful claimants under the Act.

As of 16 March 2016, successful claims had been awarded to 19,555 downwinders, 3,963 onsite participants, 6,214 uranium miners, 1,673 uranium millers and 328 ore transporters.

As of 20 April 2018, 34,372 claims in total had been approved with total compensation paid at $2,243,205,380.

As of 12 January 2023, 40,274 claims have been approved with total compensation paid at $2,598,374,306. Successful claims include: 25,663 downwinders, 5,388 onsite participants, 6,896 uranium miners, 1,921 uranium millers and 406 ore transporters.

See also
 Energy Employees Occupational Illness Compensation Program
 Compensation scheme for radiation-linked diseases (United Kingdom)
 Downwinders
 Nuclear weapons testing
 Nevada Test Site
 Uranium mining and the Navajo people
 Nuclear weapons and the United States
 Pacific Proving Grounds
 Radium and radon in the environment
 Uranium mining in the United States
 Uranium mining debate
 Anti-nuclear movement in the United States
Nuclear labor issues

References

External links
Radiation Exposure Compensation Program home page

Nuclear history of the United States
Navajo history

United States federal health legislation
1990 in law
United States tort law

Occupational safety and health